Jan Rudolph Slotemaker de Bruïne (6 May 1869 – 1 May 1941) was a Dutch politician of the defunct Christian Historical Union (CHU) party now merged into the Christian Democratic Appeal (CDA) party and theologian.

Slotemaker de Bruïne applied at the Utrecht University in June 1889 majoring in Theology and obtaining a Bachelor of Theology degree in July 1891 and worked as a student researcher before graduating with a Master of Theology degree in July 1894 and later got a doctorate as an Doctor of Theology in June 1896 and a Doctor of Philosophy in July 1898. Slotemaker de Bruïne served as a Minister of the Dutch Reformed Church from August 1894 until March 1926 in Haulerwijk from August 1894 until May 1897 in Beilen from May 1897 until January 1900 in Middelburg from January 1900 until September 1903 in Nijmegen from September 1903 until December 1907 and in Utrecht from December 1907 until March 1916. Slotemaker de Bruïne also worked as editor of the newspaper De Voorzorg from April 1903 until November 1921 and was co-founder and editor-in-chief of Christian magazine Stemmen des Tijds from January 1911 until May 1941. Slotemaker de Bruïne worked as a professor of Theology and the History of Christianity and at the Utrecht University from March 1916 until April 1925. Slotemaker de Bruïne also worked as editor-in-chief of the party newspaper De Nederlander from February 1921 until May 1941. Slotemaker de Bruïne was elected as a Member of the Senate after the Senate election of 1922, taking office on 25 July 1922. Slotemaker de Bruïne also served as Chairman of the Christian Historical Union from 15 April 1925 until 20 September 1926.

On 11 November 1925 the Cabinet Colijn I fell and continued to serve in a demissionary capacity until the cabinet formation of 1926 when it was replaced by the Cabinet De Geer I with Slotemaker de Bruïne appointed as Minister of Labour, Commerce and Industry, taking office on 8 March 1926. Slotemaker de Bruïne was elected as a Member of the House of Representatives after the election of 1929, taking office on 17 September 1929. Following the cabinet formation of 1929 Slotemaker de Bruïne was not giving a cabinet post in the new cabinet, the Cabinet De Geer I was replaced by the Cabinet Ruijs de Beerenbrouck III on 10 August 1929 and he continued to serve in the House of Representatives as a frontbencher. Slotemaker de Bruïne also served again as Chairman of the Christian Historical Union from 5 January 1932 until 30 June 1933. After the election of 1933 Slotemaker de Bruïne was appointed again in the post as the newly renamed Minister of Social Affairs in the Cabinet Colijn II, taking office on 8 June 1933. Slotemaker de Bruïne served as acting Minister of Education, Arts and Sciences from 18 May 1935 following the resignation of Henri Marchant and dual served in both positions. The Cabinet Colijn II fell on 23 July 1935 and continued to serve in a demissionary capacity until the cabinet formation of 1935 when it was replaced by the Cabinet Colijn III with Slotemaker de Bruïne appointed as permanent Minister of Education, Arts and Sciences, taking office on 31 July 1935. After the election of 1937 Slotemaker de Bruïne returned as a Member of the House of Representatives, taking office on 8 June 1937. Following the cabinet formation of 1937 Slotemaker de Bruïne continued as Minister of Education, Arts and Sciences in the Cabinet Colijn IV, taking office on 24 June 1937.

After a railway strike in 1903 he realised that the Church holds important social obligations and since then he has also participated in politics. In 1926 he became minister of labour, in 1933 and 1935 minister of social affairs and education. On 1 May 1941 Slotemaker de Bruine died in Wassenaar.

Decorations

References

External links

Official
  Dr. J.R. Slotemaker de Bruïne Parlement & Politiek
  Dr. J.R. Slotemaker de Bruïne (CHU) Eerste Kamer der Staten-Generaal

 

1869 births
1941 deaths
Calvinist and Reformed philosophers
Chairmen of the Christian Historical Union
Christian Historical Union politicians
Critics of atheism
Critics of postmodernism
Dutch academic administrators
Dutch biblical scholars
Dutch Calvinist and Reformed theologians
Dutch critics
Dutch education writers
Dutch essayists
Dutch ethicists
Dutch historians of religion
Dutch magazine editors
Dutch members of the Dutch Reformed Church
Dutch memoirists
Dutch newspaper editors
Dutch political writers
Grand Officers of the Order of Orange-Nassau
Knights of the Order of the Netherlands Lion
Members of the House of Representatives (Netherlands)
Members of the Provincial Council of Utrecht
Members of the Senate (Netherlands)
Ministers of Economic Affairs of the Netherlands
Ministers of Education of the Netherlands
Ministers of Social Affairs of the Netherlands
People from Sliedrecht
People from Wassenaar
Utrecht University alumni
Academic staff of Utrecht University
20th-century Calvinist and Reformed theologians
20th-century Dutch Calvinist and Reformed ministers
20th-century Dutch educators
20th-century Dutch historians
20th-century Dutch male writers
20th-century Dutch politicians
Grand Crosses of the Order of the White Lion